The NCI-60 cancer cell line panel is a group of 60 human cancer cell lines used by the National Cancer Institute (NCI) for the screening of compounds to detect potential anticancer activity.

Purpose 

The screening procedure is called the NCI-60 Human Tumor Cell Lines Screen, and it is one of the Discovery & Development Services of NCI's Developmental Therapeutics Program (DTP).
The screening rates for each cell line the cytostatic and cytotoxic impact of tested substances.

Due to the diversity of the cell lines, it is possible to compare tested compounds by their effect patterns, high correlation potentially corresponding to similar effect mechanisms.
An automated comparison against a database of more than 88,000 pure compounds and more than 34,000 crude extracts is provided by the COMPARE tool, which shows a list of substances ranked by the Pearson correlation coefficients for a given test substance.

The same panel is used in the Molecular Target Program for the characterization of  molecular targets. Measurements include protein levels, RNA measurements, mutation status and enzyme activity levels.

Cell Lines 

The panel holds cell lines representing leukemia, melanoma, non-small-cell lung carcinoma, and cancers of the brain, ovary, breast, colon, kidney, and prostate.

13 additional cell lines are evaluated for use in the screening program,
among them two lines deriving from so far not represented small-cell lung carcinoma.

All cell lines but one are available to other laboratories, including the additional cell lines.

Misidentification and Misclassification 

Starting around the turn of the millennium, several cell lines were found to be misidentified or misclassified at the time of investigation or earlier:

MDA-MB-435, originally classified as breast cancer cell line, was identified as being a melanoma cell line.
When investigated further, current MDA-MB-435 appeared to be derived from the same individual as cell line M14.
An examination of clones made clear that the mixup with M14 happened very early in the history of MDA-MB-435, before establishment in the Developmental Therapeutics Program.

NCI/ADR-RES, originally classified as breast cancer cell line, was identified as being an ovarian tumor cell line.
NCI/ADR-RES appears to have been derived at some point in time from cell line OVCAR-8.
Originally the cell line was named MCF-7/ADR-RES; it was renamed together with the change in classification.

Two brain cancer cell lines, SNB-19 and U251, were discovered to come from the same person.
This makes a mixup likely.

A 61st cell line, MDA-N, has been confirmed to being derived from the misclassified MDA-MB-435 cell line.
So it is also misclassified, really being a melanoma cell line, but  the official website still lists it as breast cancer cell line.
This cell line is not available .

The International Cell Line Authentication Committee maintains a list of contaminated cell lines.
It includes the cell lines reported above, although usually with reporting dates and articles considerably later than the first dates and articles rising specific concern regarding the respective cell line.

Continued Use of Wrong Classification 

 Hundreds of research studies still use MDA-MB-435 as model of breast cancer, even after it was officially declared to be a melanoma cell line in 2007, and even in highest-rated international peer-reviewed journals.
Similar is true for other misidentified cell lines.

List of NCI-60 Cell Lines

List of Additional Cell Lines

References 

Ovarian cancer